Robert Craig (2 May 1886 –  19 April 1918) was a Scottish professional football full back who played in the Scottish Football League for Dundee Hibernian, Celtic and Morton.

Personal life 
Craig was born in May 1886 in Beith, Ayrshire, the son of William and Elizabeth Craig. His father was a French polisher.

First World War 
Robert Craig served as a private in the South Wales Borderers during the First World War and was wounded during a German attack at Messines, Belgium on 11 April 1918, during the German spring offensive. He was moved to No. 13 General Hospital, Boulogne-sur-Mer, France and died on 19 April 1918, a few weeks shy of his 32rd birthday. He was buried in Boulogne Eastern Cemetery.

Career statistics

References 

Scottish footballers
1886 births
1918 deaths
British Army personnel of World War I
British military personnel killed in World War I
South Wales Borderers soldiers
Scottish Football League players
Celtic F.C. players
Association football fullbacks
Footballers from North Ayrshire
Greenock Morton F.C. players
Brighton & Hove Albion F.C. players
Southern Football League players
Carlisle United F.C. players
Darlington F.C. players
Renton F.C. players
Dundee United F.C. players
Abercorn F.C. players
Stenhousemuir F.C. players
Kilmarnock F.C. players
Ayr F.C. players
Bo'ness F.C. players
Southend United F.C. players
Abertillery Town F.C. players
People from Beith